was the lead ship of her sub-class (also known as the "modified Type-D" class) of the  escort destroyers built for the Imperial Japanese Navy during the final stages of World War II. Completed in early 1945, the ship was assigned to convoy escort duties in home waters. She was sunk on 14 July with the loss of 135 crewmen by American carrier aircraft attacking targets in southern Hokkaido.

Design and description
The Tachibana sub-class was a simplified version of the preceding  to make them even more suited for mass production. The ships had two Kampon geared steam turbines, each driving one propeller shaft, using steam provided by two Kampon water-tube boilers.

The main armament of the Tachibana sub-class consisted of three Type 89  dual-purpose guns in one twin-gun mount aft and one single mount forward of the superstructure. The single mount was partially protected against spray by a gun shield. The accuracy of the Type 89 guns was severely reduced against aircraft because no high-angle gunnery director was fitted. They carried a total of 25 Type 96  anti-aircraft guns in 4 triple and 13 single mounts. The Tachibanas were equipped with Type 13 early-warning and Type 22 surface-search radars. The ships were also armed with a single rotating quadruple mount amidships for  torpedoes. They could deliver their 60 depth charges via two stern rails and two throwers.

Construction and career

Tachibana (Mandarin Orange) was ordered in Fiscal Year 1943 under the Modified 5th Naval Armaments Supplement Program as part of the Matsu class, but the design was simplified to facilitate production and the ship was one of those built to the modified design, lending her name to the sub-class. She was laid down on 8 July 1944 by Yokosuka Naval Arsenal, launched on 14 October and completed on 20 January 1945. The ship was assigned to the Combined Fleet for working up, and was briefly attached to the Second Fleet on 1–20 April. On 22 May Tachibana arrived at Ominato at the northern end of Honshu for escort and patrol duties. The ship was stricken from the Navy List on 10 August.

Notes

Bibliography

 

 
 

Tachibana-class destroyers
1944 ships
Destroyers sunk by aircraft
Maritime incidents in July 1945
Ships sunk by US aircraft
Shipwrecks of Japan
Ships built by Yokosuka Naval Arsenal